Clarkville may refer to:

Clarkville, New Brunswick, a community in Canada
Clarkville, New Zealand, a town in New Zealand

See also
Clarksville (disambiguation)